Telebasis digiticollis, the marsh firetail, is a species of narrow-winged damselfly in the family Coenagrionidae. It is found in Central America.

The IUCN conservation status of Telebasis digiticollis is "LC", least concern, with no immediate threat to the species' survival. The population is stable.

References

Further reading

 
 

Coenagrionidae
Articles created by Qbugbot
Insects described in 1902